The 1964–65 Segunda División season was the 34th since its establishment and was played between 13 September 1964 and 18 April 1965.

Overview before the season
32 teams joined the league, including two relegated from the 1963–64 La Liga and 4 promoted from the 1963–64 Tercera División.

Relegated from La Liga
Pontevedra
Valladolid

Promoted from Tercera División
Baracaldo
Real Unión
Sabadell
Calvo Sotelo

Group North

Teams

League table

Results

Top goalscorers

Top goalkeepers

Group South

Teams

League table

Results

Top goalscorers

Top goalkeepers

Promotion playoffs

First leg

Second leg

Relegation playoffs

First leg

Second leg

Tiebreaker

External links
BDFútbol

Segunda División seasons
2
Spain